Royal Italien was a  74-gun ship of the line of the French Navy.

Career 
Royal Italien, or Reale Italiano, was one of the ships built in the various shipyards captured by the First French Empire in Holland and Italy in a crash programme to replenish the ranks of the French Navy. She was built in Venice under supervision of engineers Fonda and Andrea Salvini following plans by Sané.

Royal Italien was surrendered to Austria at the fall of Venice, and commissioned in the Austrian Navy as Reale Italiano. In 1825, she was razéed into a frigate. She was eventually broken up in 1838.

Notes, citations, and references

Notes

Citations

References
 

Ships of the line of the French Navy
Téméraire-class ships of the line
1812 ships